Rutland County Council is the local authority for the unitary authority of Rutland in England. Between 1 April 1974 and 1 April 1997 Rutland was a non-metropolitan district in Leicestershire.

Political control
Since the first election to the council in 1973 political control of the council has been held by the following parties:

Non-metropolitan district

Unitary authority

Leadership
The leaders of the council since 1995 have been:

Council elections

Non-metropolitan district elections
1973 Rutland District Council election
1976 Rutland District Council election
1979 Rutland District Council election (New ward boundaries)
1983 Rutland District Council election
1987 Rutland District Council election
1991 Rutland District Council election (District boundary changes took place but the number of seats remained the same)
1995 Rutland District Council election

Unitary authority elections
1996 Rutland County Council election
1999 Rutland County Council election
2003 Rutland County Council election (new ward boundaries increased the number of seats from 20 to 26)
2007 Rutland County Council election
2011 Rutland County Council election
2015 Rutland County Council election
2019 Rutland County Council election (new ward boundaries increased the number of seats to 27)

By-election results

1996–1999

1999–2003

2003–2007

2007–2011

2011-2015

2015-2019

2019-2023

References

Notes

External links
Rutland County Council
2007 Rutland election results
By-election results

 
Council elections in the East Midlands
Council elections in Rutland
Unitary authority elections in England